The Bride of Abydos (French – La Fiancée d'Abydos) or Selim and Zuleika is the title of two works by Eugène Delacroix, one in the Museum of Fine Arts of Lyon (pre-1849) and another in the Louvre (1843–1849).

Both works show the characters Selim and Zuleika from the poem of the same name by Lord Byron, written after he had swum the Hellespont between Abydos and Sestos in imitation of Leander.

References

Paintings by Eugène Delacroix
1840s paintings
Paintings in the Louvre by French artists
Paintings in the collection of the Museum of Fine Arts of Lyon
Water in art